In the run up to the 2024 Belgian federal election, various organisations carry out opinion polling to gauge voting intention in Belgium. The date range for these polls are from the 2019 Belgian federal election, held on 25 May, to the present day. The results of nationwide polls are usually numerically split into the three Belgian regions: Flanders, Brussels, and Wallonia. Federal seat projections for the Chamber of Representatives are presented together under these regional polls.

Flanders
The graph and the table below show the results for the opinion polls conducted in the Flemish region, and for polls conducted nationwide the part of the results related to the Flemish region.

</div>

Wallonia
The graph and the table below show the results for the opinion polls conducted in the Walloon Region, and for polls conducted nationwide the part of the results related to the Walloon Region.

</div>

Brussels
The graph and the table below show polling results in the Brussels Region (which may be part of a larger, nationwide poll). Since September 2022, only polling results for Francophone parties are published for polls conducted for VTM / Het Laatste Nieuws / RTL / Le Soir.

</div>

Seat projections
The graph and table below shows seat projections for the Chamber of Representatives according to a reporting newspaper or polling firm.

By party 

</div>

By political family 
Below are tallies for each ideological 'group' as well as probable coalitions. In bold on dark grey, if the coalition commands an absolute majority.

Note that "asymetrical" coalitions are now frequent: between 2007 and 2011, PS was part of each cabinet but not sp.a (Vooruit); and between 2014 and 2018, the Michel Government included cd&v but not cdH (LE), as well as the N-VA, of which there is no equivalent in Wallonia.

</div>

Notes

References

Opinion polling in Belgium
Belgium